André Ruiz (born 30 March 1947) is a French rugby footballer who represented his country in both rugby league and rugby union, including in the four Rugby League World Cups.

Playing career
Ruiz originally played rugby union and in 1968 played in two test matches for the France national rugby union team.

He then switched to rugby league and represented the France national rugby league team, making his debut at the 1970 Rugby League World Cup. He went on to play in 19 internationals for France, including in the 1972, 1975 and 1977 Rugby League World Cups.

References

1947 births
Living people
AS Carcassonne players
Dual-code rugby internationals
France international rugby union players
France national rugby league team players
French rugby league players
French rugby union players
Sportspeople from Hautes-Pyrénées
Rugby league centres
Rugby union centres
Tarbes Pyrénées Rugby players